A by-election was held for the New South Wales Legislative Assembly electorate of Goldfields South on 12 December 1870 as a result of the Legislative Assembly declaring the election of Ezekiel Baker was void. Baker had been appointed to conduct a Royal Commission to inquire into the laws and regulations of the goldfields and for securing a permanent water supply. The Committee of Elections and Qualifications held that this appointment was an office of profit under the crown which meant he was incapable of being elected, or of sitting, or voting, as a member of the Assembly.

Dates

Polling places

 Adelong
 Kimo, near Gundagai
 Grenfell
 Quondong
 Wombat
 Elrington, now known as Majors Creek
 Kiandra
 Upper Adelong
 Broken-cart Creek, near Talbingo
 Reedy Flat, now known as Batlow
 Araluen
 Mongarlowe
 Jembaicumbene
 Junee
 Sebastopol.

Result

The Committee of Elections and Qualifications held that the appointment of Ezekiel Baker to conduct a Royal Commission into the goldfields meant that he held an office of profit under the crown and his election was declared void.

See also
Electoral results for the district of Goldfields South
List of New South Wales state by-elections

References

1870 elections in Australia
New South Wales state by-elections
1870s in New South Wales